Catspaw was an Australian drama-action TV series about an airforce officer who becomes involved with mercenaries.

It aired on the ABC on 8 June 1978 and ended on 20 July of the same year running for only one season and a total of seven episodes.

References

External links
Catspaw at IMDb
Catspaw at AustLit

Australian Broadcasting Corporation original programming
Australian action television series
Australian drama television series
1978 Australian television series debuts
1978 Australian television series endings